The 1898 Delaware football team represented Delaware College—now known as the University of Delaware–as an independent during the 1898 college football season. Led by second-year head coach Herbert Rice, the team posted a 2–5–2 record.

Schedule

References

Delaware
Delaware Fightin' Blue Hens football seasons
Delaware football